Marconnelle is a commune in the Pas-de-Calais department in the Hauts-de-France region of France.

Geography
Marconelle is a suburb of Hesdin, situated 13 miles (21 km) southeast of Montreuil-sur-Mer, on the D349 road.

Population

Places of interest
 The church of Saint-Croix, dating from the eighteenth century.

See also
 Communes of the Pas-de-Calais department

References

Communes of Pas-de-Calais
Artois